Gilmar Jones (born 21 January 1986) is a Surinamese badminton player and national coach of the Surinamese badminton team. In 2015 and 2017, he became the champion in men's doubles event at the Surinamese National Badminton Championships. He is the current National mixed doubles champion of Suriname. He first won the mixed doubles title in 2017 with Priscille Tjitrodipo, and retained the National Surinamese title the following two years with different partners in 2018 with Rugshaar Ishaak and in 2019 with Anjali Paragsingh.
His biggest international achievement to date is winning the Caribbean title in Men's Doubles with Dylan Darmohoetomo in 2016 at the Carebaco International in Aruba. Together with doubles partner Dylan Darmohoetomo he also reached the finals of the Carebaco International in 2018 held in his home town Paramaribo. Beginning of 2018 Gilmar Jones was appointed  the head-coach of the National badminton team of Suriname.

Achievements

BWF International Challenge/Series 
Men's doubles

  BWF International Challenge tournament
  BWF International Series tournament
  BWF Future Series tournament

References

External links 
 

1986 births
Living people
Sportspeople from Paramaribo
Surinamese male badminton players
Competitors at the 2006 Central American and Caribbean Games